Maracanthus is a genus of flowering plants belonging to the family Loranthaceae.

Its native range is Costa Rica to Venezuela.

Species:

Maracanthus badilloi 
Maracanthus chlamydatus 
Maracanthus costaricensis

References

Loranthaceae
Loranthaceae genera